The abbreviation ECSU can refer to:

 Eastern Connecticut State University
 Elizabeth City State University
 Emmanuel College Students' Union
 Ethiopian Civil Service University